Sabotsy Namehana is a rural municipality in Analamanga Region, in the  Central Highlands of Madagascar. It belongs to the district of Antananarivo Avaradrano and its populations numbers to 57,363 in 2018.

It is located along the National Road 3, 10 km North of Antananarivo.

Economy
The economy is based on agriculture.  Rice, corn, peanuts, beans, manioc are the main crops.

Personalities
Hery Rajaonarimampianina (* 1958), politician

References

Commune Sabotsy Namehana
Monographie de la Commune

External links

Populated places in Analamanga